George Wright Watson Peden (born 12 April 1943) is a Scottish former footballer who played 13 times in the Scottish Football League for Heart of Midlothian and made 223 appearances in the Football League for Lincoln City. He played at left back. Peden joined Hearts from junior club Arniston Rangers in May 1964, and after leaving Lincoln played non-league football in England for Worksop Town.

In September 1967, Peden and Jim Grummett scored the goals as Lincoln eliminated First Division club Newcastle United in the second round of the League Cup. The team went on to reach the fourth round, in which they lost to Derby County after a replay in front of what remains, Lincoln's record home attendance, of 23,196.

References

1943 births
Living people
Sportspeople from Midlothian
Scottish footballers
Association football fullbacks
Arniston Rangers F.C. players
Heart of Midlothian F.C. players
Lincoln City F.C. players
Scottish Football League players
English Football League players
Worksop Town F.C. players